"Tia Tamera" is a song by American rapper Doja Cat featuring guest vocals from fellow American rapper Rico Nasty. It was written by Doja Cat, Kurtis McKenzie, David Sprecher, Lydia Asrat, and Rico Nasty, while being produced by the former two. It was released for digital download and streaming on February 20, 2019, by Kemosabe Records and RCA Records as the second single to the deluxe edition (and fourth overall) of her debut album Amala.

Composition and lyrics
The lyrics reference celebrities such as Aaliyah, Sia, Venus Williams, Serena Williams, Regina Hall, Wiz Khalifa, Nia Long, Madea, organizations including Genius and PETA, films such as West Side Story, songs such as "Rock the Boat" and brands such as Chia Pet, Ikea, Nokia. The title track is rapped throughout the lyrics with comparisons of her breasts to twin actresses Tia Mowry and Tamera Mowry. Rico is the last verse on the song, and "flexes her bank account, [and] foreign whips".

Critical reception
The song received widespread acclaim from music critics for its eclectic lyrics and catchy flow. Okayplayer's Ivie Ani praises the track's lyricism, calling the composition "raunchy, rebellious, and real rap". Brooklyn-based blog Brooklyn Vegan explains Rico's verse to be a "show-stopper", while Uproxx's Andre Gee describe both the song and music video as an "earworm of a hook and a colorful video that allowed each artist to be the vibrant characters we love them as".

Music video
The music video, directed by Roxana Baldovin, premiered on YouTube on February 21, 2019. As of January 2021, it has gained over 63 million views. The video is a "candy-colored visual" of Doja and Rico competing in a '90s game show against respective lookalikes, with reference to the sitcom Sister, Sister and the Nickelodeon game show Double Dare. The video gives a "colorful 90's vibe". Pitchfork ranked it as one of their Top 20 Music Videos of 2019.

Synopsis
The video begins with Doja and Rico competing in a game show against their lookalikes. The duo watch the hip-hop rapper Ka5sh get slimed. The video references the 1997 comedy film B*A*P*S with redoing hairstyles from the main characters of the film, Nisi, played by Halle Berry, and Mickey, played by Natalie Desselle. During the final scenes, Doja and Rico pour neon yellow slime on the game show host.

Credits and personnel
Recording and management
 Engineered at The Himalayas (Los Angeles, California)
 Mastered at Bernie Grundman Mastering (Hollywood, California)
 Mau Publishing, Inc./Prescription Songs (BMI), The Arcade Songs LLC (BMI), Desta Melodies (BMI), Yeti Yeti Yeti Music/WB Music Corp. (ASCAP), WB Music Corp. (ASCAP)
Rico Nasty appears courtesy of Warner Music/Atlantic Recording Corporation

Personnel

Doja Cat – vocals, songwriting
Kurtis McKenzie – songwriting; production
Lydia Asrat – songwriting
David Sprecher – songwriting; engineering 
Rico Nasty – vocals, songwriting
Neal H Pogue – mixing 
Mike Bozzi – mastering

Credits adapted from Hot Pink (Japan Version) liner notes.

Certifications

Release history

References

2019 songs
2019 singles
Doja Cat songs
RCA Records singles
Songs written by Kurtis Mckenzie
Songs written by Yeti Beats
Songs written by Doja Cat
Rico Nasty songs